The Ailao Mountains (Hani: Hhaqlol haolgaoq) are located in Yunnan, China. The Ailao Mountain Nature Reserve is located in the Ailao Mountains, is about 503.60 square kilometres and was created in 1986.

Mountain ranges of Yunnan
Geography of Chuxiong Yi Autonomous Prefecture
Geography of Yuxi
Geography of Pu'er
Geography of Honghe Hani and Yi Autonomous Prefecture